Czernice Borowe  is a village in Przasnysz County, Masovian Voivodeship, in east-central Poland. It is the seat of the gmina (administrative district) called Gmina Czernice Borowe.

The village has a population of 480.

References

Czernice Borowe